Phil Cass (born 2 May 1965) is an Australian magician and comedy entertainer based in Sydney. He was the recipient of the Gold MO Award for 2013 Australian Performer of the Year.

Career 
Cass is a former rugby league player with Brisbane Souths.

Cass has performed over 5000 shows. He has performed four seasons at Magic Castle in Hollywood, as well as performances in Fiji, Japan, the Philippines, New Zealand, Noumea, Singapore, Hong Kong, Bangkok, Papua New Guinea, World Expo 88, and various club and corporate work throughout Australia.

Publications 
 Oh No! Not a Magician!! (1992)

DVDs 
 Phil Cass in Action
 Funniest Comedy Compilation Collector's Set
The Best of the Footy Show Comedians
Pea & Shell Game
 Street Shells

Awards and recognition

Mo Awards
The Australian Entertainment Mo Awards (commonly known informally as the Mo Awards), were annual Australian entertainment industry awards. They recognise achievements in live entertainment in Australia from 1975 to 2016. Phil Cass won nine awards in that time.
 (wins only)
|-
| 1991
| Phil Cass
| Specialty Act of the Year 
| 
|-
| 1992
| Phil Cass
| Specialty Act of the Year
| 
|-
| 1993
| Phil Cass
| Specialty Act of the Year
| 
|-
| 1995
| Phil Cass
| Versatile Variety Performance of the Year
| 
|-
| 1996
| Phil Cass
| Specialty Act of the Year 
| 
|-
| 1997
| Phil Cass
| Specialty Act of the Year
| 
|-
| 1998
| Phil Cass
| Specialty Act of the Year
| 
|-
|rowspan="2"| 2013
| Phil Cass
| Best Specialty Act of the Year
| 
|-
| Phil Cass
| Peter Allen Performer of the Year 
| 
|-

Other awards
 8 time Wallace Art Awards including Comedian of the Year and the Entertainer of the Year
 National 'ACE' (Australian Club Entertainment) Awards for Sight Act of the Year (Phil & Philippa) in 1998, 1999, 2000
 8 time internal 'Best Magician' type awards including a Genii's trophy for his "Outstanding Contribution to Comedy Magic in Australia

References

External links
 Official website

Living people
Australian performance artists
Australian magicians
1956 births
People from Toowoomba